was a village located in Kitatsugaru District in western Aomori Prefecture, Japan.

Kodomari was located in far northwest corner of Tsugaru Peninsula facing the Sea of Japan and Tsugaru Strait. The area was part of Hirosaki Domain during the Edo period. After the Meiji Restoration, Kodomari Village was created on April 1, 1889.

On March 28, 2005, Kodomari, along with the neighboring town of Nakasato (also from Kitatsugaru District), was merged to create the town of Nakadomari, and thus no longer exists as an independent municipality.

At the time of its merger, Kodomari had an estimated population of 3,989 and a population density of 61.73 persons per km². The total area was 64.62 km².

The village economy was dominated by agriculture and forestry.

Dissolved municipalities of Aomori Prefecture